Il Chupan (also Romanized as Il Chūpān; also known as Ilchapan) is a village in Niyarak Rural District, Tarom Sofla District, Qazvin County, Qazvin Province, Iran. At the 2006 census, its population was 23, in 5 families.

References 

Populated places in Qazvin County